Robin Neumann (born 12 December 1997) is a Dutch competitive swimmer who specializes in freestyle.

Neumann competed at the 2014 Youth Olympics in Nanjing, China, where she swam individually in the backstroke events. Since then she has changed her focus to freestyle.

At the 2015 European Short Course Championships in Netanya, Israel, she finished 4th in the 200 meter freestyle.

She qualified for the 2016 Summer Olympics in Rio de Janeiro in the 200 meter freestyle and the 4 × 200 meter freestyle relay. In the 200 m freestyle she finished 26th in the heats and did not advance to the semifinals. In the 4 × 200 meter freestyle relay, her team finished 14th in the heats.

Personal life
Neumann has an Austrian father and a Dutch mother. She is from Germany but currently represents the Netherlands.

See also
List of Dutch records in swimming

References

1997 births
Living people
Dutch female freestyle swimmers
Olympic swimmers of the Netherlands
Swimmers at the 2016 Summer Olympics
European Aquatics Championships medalists in swimming
Swimmers at the 2014 Summer Youth Olympics
Medalists at the FINA World Swimming Championships (25 m)
Dutch female backstroke swimmers
People from Munich
21st-century Dutch women